Swiss Medical Network SA is a Swiss group of private hospitals. At present, it holds 15 private health care facilities in Switzerland with a total of 1,300 consultants and 2,700 employees. The group is a subsidiary of AEVIS VICTORIA SA.

History
The group was founded in 2002. Its historical name (Genolier Swiss Medical Network) derives from the Clinique de Genolier, a private hospital founded in 1972, located in the municipality of Genolier in the Swiss Canton of Vaud.

Following its foundation, the group has acquired a number of private hospitals in several parts of Switzerland in order to create a national network of private health care facilities: 
 2002 : Acquisition of the Clinique de Genolier by five main shareholders and creation of AGEN Holding, later renamed into Genolier Swiss Medical Network SA
 2003 : Acquisition of the Clinique de Montchoisi in Lausanne, Canton of Vaud (opened in 1923)
 2005 : Acquisition of the Clinique Valmont in Montreux, Canton of Vaud (opened in 1905) and the two hospitals Sainte-Anne and Garcia in Fribourg (the two latter ones were then merged in order to become the Clinique Générale Ste. Anne)
 2007 : Inauguration of the Centre d’oncologie des Eaux-Vives, the only private radio-oncology centre in Geneva 
 2008 : AGEN Holding becomes Genolier Swiss Medical Network SA.
 2009 : Acquisition of the Centre médico-chirurgical des Eaux-Vives in Geneva.
 2010 : Acquisition of Privatklinik Bethanien in Zurich (opened in 1912) 
 2011 : Partial acquisition (49%) of Privatklinik Lindberg in Winterthur (opened in 1906)  and affiliation of Klinik Pyramide am See in Zurich.
 2012 : Acquisition of Privatklinik Obach in Solothurn (opened in 1922), Clinica Ars Medica (opened in 1989) and Clinica Sant’Anna (opened in 1922) in Lugano, Canton of Ticinio and full acquisition of Privatklinik Lindberg.
 2013 : Acquisition of the Clinique de Valère in Sion, Canton of Valais (opened in 1920), Hôpital de la Providence in Neuchâtel (opened in 1859)   and Privatklinik Villa im Park in Rothrist, Canton of Argovia (opened in 1984) 
 2014 : Acquisition of Schmerzklinik Basel (opened in 1978)  
 2015 : Acquisition of the Clinique Montbrillant in La Chaux-de-Fonds
 2015 : Genolier Swiss Medical Network changes its name to Swiss Medical Network in order to claim the maturity of the Group and to better reflect its national status as well as its federating role for its 15 clinics.
2016 : Acquisition of Clinique Générale-Beaulieu in Geneva

Primary sources

References 

Hospitals in Switzerland